The Sur Empire was an Afghan dynasty which ruled a large territory in the northern part of the Indian subcontinent for nearly 16 years, between 1540 and 1556, with Sasaram, in modern-day Bihar, serving as its capital. 

The Sur dynasty held control of nearly all the Mughal Empire territories, from eastern Balochistan, Pakistan in the west to modern-day Rakhine, Myanmar in the east.

History 
Sher Shah, an ethnic Pashtun of the tribal house of Sur,  first served as a private before rising to become a commander in the Mughal army under Babur and then the governor of Bihar. In 1537, when Babur's son Humayun was elsewhere on an expedition, Sher Shah overran the state of Bengal and established the Suri dynasty. The Sur supplanted the Mughal dynasty as rulers of North India during the reign of the relatively ineffectual second Mughal Humayun. Sher Shah defeated Badshah-i-Hind ('Hindustani emperor') Humayun in the Battle of Chausa (26 June 1539) and again in the Battle of Bilgram (17 May 1540).

Sher Shah Suri was known for the destruction of some old cities while conquering parts of India. He has been accused by `Abd al-Qadir Bada'uni and other Muslim historians for destroying old cities in order to build new ones on their ruins after his own name. One example included Shergarh. Sher Shah is also said to have destroyed Dinpanah, which Humayun was constructing as the "sixth city of Delhi". The new city built by him, was itself destroyed in 1555 after Humayun re-conquered the territory from the Surs. Tarikh-i-Da'udi states, however, that he destroyed Siri. Abbas Sarwani states that he had the older city of Delhi destroyed. Tarikh-i-Khan Jahan states that Salim Shah Suri had built a wall around Humayun's imperial city.

The Sur dynasty held control of nearly all the Mughal territories, from  Balochistan in the west to modern-day Bangladesh in the east.

Their rule came to an end by a defeat that led to the restoration of the Mughal Empire.

List of Sur dynasty rulers

See also 
 Sur (Pashtun tribe)
 Delhi Sultanate
 List of Sunni dynasties

References

Sources

 
1556 disestablishments in India
States and territories established in 1540
States and territories disestablished in 1556
History of Bengal
History of Bihar
History of India
History of Pakistan
1540 establishments in India
16th century in Delhi
Sunni dynasties